Monte das Vacas is a mountain located in the southeastern part of the island of Santiago, Cape Verde. It is 2 km south of Ribeirão Chiqueiro and 8 km of the city centre of the capital Praia. Its elevation is 437 meters. It is of volcanic origin and was formed between 1.1 and 0.7 million years ago.

See also
 List of mountains in Cape Verde

References

Mountains of Cape Verde
Geography of Santiago, Cape Verde
Praia
São Domingos Municipality, Cape Verde